Live from New York City, 1967 is the second live album by Simon & Garfunkel, recorded at Philharmonic Hall at Lincoln Center in New York City, on 22 January 1967. The album was released on the Columbia Legacy CK 61513 label on 16 July 2002.

The performance was the first official live release by Simon and Garfunkel recorded in the 1960s. Recorded in 1967 prior to the duo's work on the soundtrack to The Graduate. It features many of the duo's early hits and album tracks, such as "Leaves That Are Green", "He Was My Brother", and "For Emily, Whenever I May Find Her".

Four of the tracks from the album were previously released on 1997's Old Friends box-set which contained five songs from the Lincoln Center concert, though "Red Rubber Ball" was not included on this release.

In contrast to the duo's other official live releases (The Concert in Central Park, Old Friends: Live on Stage, and Live 1969), this recording features Paul Simon and Art Garfunkel performing alone. This album does not capture the same show as the bootleg Live from New York City, 1966, despite similar material and packaging.

Track listing
All songs by Paul Simon, except where noted.

 "He Was My Brother" – 3:21
 "Leaves That Are Green" – 2:57
 "Sparrow" – 3:06
 "Homeward Bound" – 2:39
 "You Don't Know Where Your Interest Lies" – 2:06
 "A Most Peculiar Man" – 2:59
 "The 59th Street Bridge Song (Feelin' Groovy)" – 1:49
 "The Dangling Conversation" – 3:01
 "Richard Cory" – 3:23
 "A Hazy Shade of Winter" – 2:37
 "Benedictus" (Traditional, arr. Simon & Art Garfunkel) – 2:45
 "Blessed" – 3:45
 "A Poem on the Underground Wall" – 4:45
 "Anji" (Davy Graham) – 2:28
 "I Am a Rock" – 2:57
 "The Sound of Silence" – 3:25
 "For Emily, Whenever I May Find Her" – 2:40
 "A Church Is Burning" – 3:43
 "Wednesday Morning, 3 A.M." – 3:35

Personnel
Paul Simon: Acoustic guitar, vocals
Art Garfunkel: Vocals

References

2002 live albums
Columbia Records live albums
Legacy Recordings live albums
Simon & Garfunkel live albums
Albums produced by Roy Halee
Albums recorded at the Lincoln Center for the Performing Arts
Albums produced by Paul Simon
Albums produced by Art Garfunkel